New Palestine may refer to:

New Palestine (magazine), a former magazine published by the Zionist Organization of America
New Palestine, Indiana
New Palestine, Illinois
New Palestine, Ohio

See also